Pilanpo is a bodhisattva and the mother of Maori Xingguan in Chinese folk religion.

Legends
According to legend, Pilanpo is a shapeshifter whose true form is a hen. Since hens and peacocks are seen as related through the phoenix (fenghuang), she is considered to be a relative of the bodhisattva and former peacock Mahamayuri, the godmother of the Buddha. Pilanpo's son is a rooster and star deity (昴日星官, the Sun Rooster of Hairy Head). 

Pilanpo is said to live in seclusion in the Thousand Flowers Cave (千花洞) of the Purple Clouds Mountain (紫雲山). She is sometimes equated with Ākāśagarbha, a bodhisattva of the great element (mahābhūta) of space (ākāśa).

Journey to the West
In Journey to the West, Tang Sanzang is captured by the powerful Hundred Eyed Demon King. He has a thousand eyes that radiate brilliant golden light to confuse his enemies and victims, even the Buddha may not break his radiate brilliant golden light.

Sun Wukong is not able to defeat the demon king until, on the instructions of Lishan Laomu, Sun Wukong requests help from Pilanpo. She eventually subdues and captures the demon king with an embroidery needle - not one made of iron or steel, but extracted by her son from his own eyes. Pilanpo sends the demon king to guard Thousand Flowers Cave.

References

Sources

Chinese deities
Chinese goddesses
Chinese salvationist religions